Scanlan may refer to:

Surnames
 Mac Scannláin
 Ó Scannláin
 Ó Scannail
 Ó Scealláin

People
Scanlan (surname)

Characters
Scanlan Shorthalt, a gnome bard in the D&D Web Series Critical Role

Things
Monsignor Scanlan High School
Scanlan's Monthly
Scanlan SG-1A, glider

See also
Scanlon (disambiguation)
Patrick O'Scanlan